Zhaksy (Jaqsy) is a village in northern-central Kazakhstan. It is the seat of Zhaksy District in Akmola Region.

References

Populated places in Akmola Region